The unveiling of the Gundulić monument in Dubrovnik on May 20, 1893, was a symbolical event in the political history of Dubrovnik, since it brought to the surface the wider tensions between the two political sides of the city, the Croats and the Serb-Catholics  in the pre-World War I political struggles in the region.

The preparation
At its session of March 9, 1880, the Municipal Council of Dubrovnik adopted the proposition received from the "Dubrovnik Youth", an organization known as part of the Serb-Catholic movement in Dubrovnik, to raise a monument for the 300th anniversary of the birth of Gundulić in 1888. The mayor of the city at the time was Rafael "Rafo" Pucić. It was decided that a five-member committee would be nominated to oversee the monument's construction. The members were esteemed intellectuals Medo Pucić, Pero Budmani, Ivo Kaznačić, Mato Vodopić and Luko Zore. In 1882, the budget for the monument's erection was 11,000 florins.

In 1882, the oversight committee president Medo Pucić died, as did Ivan August Kaznačić in 1883. Mato Vodopić relinquished his membership when he was named Bishop in 1882, and Budmani also left the committee to focus on his work for the Academy's Dictionary; the work was hampered by lack of funding as well.

When the political coalition of the Serb-Catholic and Autonomist party members re-initiated work on it, the committee was reconstituted in 1891 with new members Marinica Giorgi, Lujo Bizzarro, Niko Bošković, Ivo Bogoević, Luko Bona, Brnja Caboga, Baldo Kostić, Vlaho Matijević, Jero Pugliesi, Stijepo Tomašević, Luko Zore and Nikola Ucov. The budget for the monument's erection was increased to 15,800 florins. The new committee organized new ways of funding, advertized the effort in newspapers and among various dignitaries, even reaching out to the emigrants in Argentina.

The construction was financed by King of Serbia Aleksandar Obrenović and among the others investors were Niko Pucić, who gave 5 florins, and Vlaho DeGiulli, who gave 10 florins. 

The monument was erected on May 20, 1893, in Dubrovnik's largest square, Poljana. It was made by the Croatian sculptor Ivan Rendić. The official unveiling was scheduled for the next month.

The unveiling

The unveiling, like all the official celebrations in that period, was not only cultural, but also strongly national and political. The members of the Croatian Party of Rights and the Croatian People's Party together tried to bring to Dubrovnik as many Croats as possible from various Croat regions to give the Croatian national and political character to the celebration. On the other hand, the members of the Serb Party (Serb-Catholics) tried to gather as many Serbs-Catholics as possible to give a Serbian flavor to the celebration. 
 
It was officially revealed on Sunday, July 26, 1893, by the last male member of the family, Baron Frano Getaldić-Gundulić (see House of Gundulić). The celebration included more people from outside Dubrovnik than the citizens.

References

Sources
In Croatian:
Ivo Perić, Mladi Supilo (Young Supilo), Zagreb, 1996
Newspaper Crvena Hrvatska (Red Croatia), Dubrovnik, No. 32, August 12, 1893, pp. 1–2.
Ivo Banac, Dubrovački eseji (Dubrovnik essays), Dubrovnik, 1992

 

History of Dubrovnik
Political history of Croatia
1893 in Croatia
1893 in politics
Serb-Catholic movement in Dubrovnik